WTUX (101.1 FM) is an American mainstream rock radio station licensed to Gouldsboro, Maine, United States.  The station is owned by Blueberry Broadcasting, LLC and simulcasts co-owned WTOS-FM.

History
This station received its original construction permit from the Federal Communications Commission on May 25, 2006.  The new station was assigned the WLEK call sign by the FCC on April 30, 2009.

In April 2008, permit holder Louis Vitali filed an application with the FCC to transfer the permit to a company he controlled, Blueberry Broadcasting, LLC.  The transfer was approved by the FCC on April 30, 2008, and the transaction was consummated on June 4, 2008.

On January 7, 2009, WLEK applied to change its community of license to Gouldsboro, Maine.  , the FCC has accepted this application for filing but has taken no further action on the request.  WLEK received its license to cover with Machias as its community of license from the FCC on May 13, 2009.

WLEK changed its call letters to WTUX on May 20, 2010, and in June 2010 signed on the air, simulcasting Augusta-based WTOS-FM.

References

External links

TUX
Radio stations established in 2010
Album-oriented rock radio stations in the United States
Hancock County, Maine
Blueberry Broadcasting radio stations